Liu Fuzhi (March 1917 – 25 August 2013) was a politician of the People's Republic of China. He served as the Procurator-General of the Supreme People's Procuratorate, Minister of Public Security, and Minister of Justice.

Biography
Liu was born in Mei County, Guangdong province in 1917.

In 1937, he entered the Yan'an North Shaanxi Public School and joined the Communist Party of China the following year. He served as Secretary-General of the Eighth Route Army Commander Zhu De, Director of the 129th Division of the Eighth Route Army, Secretary of the Political Commissar Deng Xiaoping, Chief of the Department of Political Affairs of the 129th Division of the Political Department of the 129th Division, Director of the Social Department of the Central Committee of the Shanxi-Hebei Central Committee, Director of the Social Affairs Department of the North China Bureau of the CPC Central Committee, and Central Military Commission Deputy Director of the General Office of the Ministry of Public Security.

After the founding of the People's Republic of China, he served as director of the General Office of the Ministry of Public Security and deputy director of the Ministry of Public Security. From January 1964 to December 1977, Liu was imprisoned due to the Cultural Revolution. He then served as Vice Minister of Culture, National People's Congress Deputy Director of the Legal Committee of the Standing Committee, Secretary General of the Political and Legal Committee of the CPC Central Committee, Minister of the Ministry of Justice, Minister of Public Security (April 1983–September 1985), First Political Commissar of the Chinese People's Armed Police Force, Deputy Secretary of the Political and Legal Committee of the CPC Central Committee, and Procurator-General of the Supreme People's Procuratorate (1988–1993). He was a member of the 12th and 13th Central Committee of the Communist Party of China, a representative of the 13th National Congress, and a member of the Central Advisory Committee.

Liu died of an illness in August 2013 at the age of 96. He is buried in Babaoshan Revolutionary Cemetery.

Notes

External links
  Liu Fuzhi's profile

1917 births
Hakka people
People from Meixian District
People's Republic of China politicians from Guangdong
2013 deaths
Chinese Communist Party politicians from Guangdong
Academic staff of China University of Political Science and Law
Presidents of universities and colleges in China
Educators from Guangdong
Ministers of Public Security of the People's Republic of China
Ministers of Justice of the People's Republic of China
Procurator-General of the Supreme People's Procuratorate
Politicians from Meizhou
Burials at Babaoshan Revolutionary Cemetery